The Rural Municipality of Mayfield No. 406 is a rural municipality (RM) in the Canadian province of Saskatchewan within Census Division No. 16 and  Division No. 6.

History 
The RM of Mayfield No. 406 incorporated as a rural municipality on December 13, 1909. The RM's name is a portmanteau of Maymont and Fielding.

Geography

Communities and localities 
The following urban municipalities are surrounded by the RM.

Villages
Denholm
Maymont
Ruddell

The following unincorporated communities are within the RM.

Localities
Fielding
Lilac

Glenburn Regional Park 
The park is near the location of the former Maymont Ferry, which operated crossing the North Saskatchewan River from 1926 to 1975. Access to the park is from Highway 376.

The park has a campground with 61 campsites, ball diamonds, a 3-hole grass greens golf course, disc golf, a man-made swimming pool that is spring fed, access to the river, and hiking trails.

Demographics 

Government 
The RM of Mayfield No. 406 is governed by an elected municipal council and an appointed administrator that meets on the second Wednesday of every month. The reeve of the RM is Craig Hamilton while its administrator is Brenda Appleton. The RM's office is located in Maymont.

References 

M

Division No. 16, Saskatchewan